Celotex Corp. v. Catrett, 477 U.S. 317 (1986), was a case decided by the United States Supreme Court. Written by Associate Justice William Rehnquist, the decision of the Court held that a party moving for summary judgment need show only that the opposing party lacks evidence sufficient to support its case. A broader version of that doctrine was later formally added to the Federal Rules of Civil Procedure.  

Celotex was one of a "trilogy" of U.S. Supreme Court decisions on summary judgment issued in 1986, the other two being Anderson v. Liberty Lobby and Matsushita Electric Industrial Co. v. Zenith Radio Corp.. Within 20 years these three became the most-cited Supreme Court decisions in the U.S. federal court system.

Case history
In September 1980, Catrett (respondent-plaintiff) sued fifteen asbestos manufacturers and distributors—including Celotex (petitioner-defendant)—in United States District Court for the District of Columbia, on the basis of evidence alleging that her husband, Louis H. Catrett, died in 1979 of health effects of exposure to asbestos manufactured or distributed by the defendants. Catrett sought recovery for claims arising from negligence, breach of warranty, and strict liability on the part of the defendant corporations.

Two of the defendants filed motions for dismissal for lack of personal jurisdiction. The district court granted the motions and the remaining thirteen defendant corporations including Celotex filed motions for summary judgment on other grounds. Celotex filed its motion in September 1981 and argued that summary judgment was proper because Catrett had failed to produce evidence that any of Celotex's products were the proximate cause of damages within the jurisdictional limits of the court. Celotex noted that in interrogatories, Catrett had failed to identify any witnesses who could testify to her husband's exposure to Celotex's products. Catrett then sought to enter into evidence three documents: a transcript of a deposition of decedent, a letter from one of decedent's former employers whom petitioner planned to call as a trial witness, and a letter from an official of an insurance company to Catrett's attorney. Catrett alleged that each of the documents tended to establish that the decedent had been exposed to Celotex's asbestos products in Chicago during 1970-1971. Celotex objected to the evidence, arguing that the three documents were hearsay and therefore could not be considered in opposition to Celotex's motion for summary judgment. The district court sustained Celotex's objection to the evidence.

The federal district court found that Catrett lacked evidence to show that she could prevail at trial on the basis of a preponderance of the evidence. Under Rule 56 of the Federal Rules of Civil Procedure, summary judgment, the case was dismissed. On appeal, the Court of Appeals for the District of Columbia Circuit reversed the district court's decision. Finally, the Supreme Court reversed the appeals court's decision and remanded the case.

Issues
The issue of this case was whether petitioner-defendant Celotex Corp.'s attempted showing that the respondent-plaintiff had put forth inadequate evidence showing that her husband had been exposed to Celotex asbestos was a sufficient basis on which to grant summary judgment. Some have interpreted the decision as shifting the burden of proof for summary judgment from the moving party ("movant") to the respondent (facially challenging Adickes v. S.H. Kress Co. (1970), though the Court did not technically overrule Kress, and in fact attempted to reconcile the Celotex decision with the former case). Celotex affirmed that the movant still must "show" the respondent does not have enough evidence to make out a prima facie case  (for example, by pointing out specific discovery responses where the respondent admits a lack of evidence). 

Respondent-plaintiff had argued that Celotex Corp.'s motion for summary judgment was insufficiently "supported," and that the moving party must provide affidavits. On this basis, the court of appeals reversed the decision to grant summary judgment for Celotex Corp., but the Supreme Court stated in its decision that affidavits were not necessary, as long as it demonstrated the lack of a genuine issue for trial.

Thus, according to the Celotex standard, the movant in a motion for summary judgment must show the absence of genuine factual issues in the nonmovant's case, although the movant is not required specifically to negate any aspects of his opponent's claims.

References

Footnotes

Works cited

See also
 List of United States Supreme Court cases, volume 477
 List of United States Supreme Court cases
 Lists of United States Supreme Court cases by volume
 List of United States Supreme Court cases by the Burger Court

External links
  Full text opinion from Findlaw.com
 Full text opinion on Lawlio.com
 Case Brief for Celotex Corp. v. Catrett

United States Supreme Court cases
United States summary judgment case law
1986 in United States case law
Asbestos disasters 
United States Supreme Court cases of the Burger Court